90 Minutes Live was a Canadian television late-night talk show, which aired on CBC Television from April 19, 1976, to May 12, 1978. The program aired weekday evenings at 11:30 p.m.

Hosted by Peter Gzowski, the program was patterned after CBC Radio's This Country in the Morning, with both current affairs and entertainment features. Other personalities associated with the program included Allan Fotheringham, Rick Moranis, Andre Gagnon, Anne Ditchburn, Danny Finkleman, Valri Bromfield, John Harvard and Flo & Eddie.

The program was not successful with CBC audiences, and was replaced in 1978 by Canada After Dark.

References

1970s Canadian television talk shows
CBC Television original programming
1976 Canadian television series debuts
Canadian late-night television programming
1978 Canadian television series endings